Te Onepoto / Taylors Mistake is a locality in New Zealand's South Island, at the southeastern extremity of the city of Christchurch Taylors Mistake is a bay adjacent to the locality, on the north side of Awaroa / Godley Head, on the northern edge of Banks Peninsula.

The name Te Onepoto / Taylors Mistake is one of New Zealand's dual placenames. The Māori portion, Te Onepoto, means short or little beach. For the English portion, the Lyttelton Times in 1865 said it was "originally called Vincent's Bay, and more recently Taylors Mistake, owing to the master of a vessel running in here during the night-time, thinking he was about to pass over the Sumner Bar."

There are almost 50 small century-old seaside baches remaining on the coastal strip between Hobsons Bay to the north, and Boulder Bay to the south. Some were cave baches, with Whare Moki being considered the oldest surviving example in NZ. Most of the baches were in 1995 or 2016 recognised as heritage assets by either Heritage NZ or by the Christchurch City Council under the resource management act. The baches appear in vernacular works of art and poetry, including a 1956 painting by Bill Sutton (artist) held at the Christchurch Art Gallery

The beach is popular with swimmers and surfers, and a livecam operated by some of the bach-holders allows conditions to be checked in advance. The Taylors Mistake Surf Life Saving Club was established at the beach, by bach-holders and others, in 1916. During World War II, hills above the beach were fortified with two machine gun posts, to guard the Godley Head coastal defence battery.

References

Bays of Canterbury, New Zealand
Populated places in Canterbury, New Zealand
Populated coastal places in New Zealand